The 2022–2023 mpox outbreak in India is a part of the ongoing outbreak of human mpox caused by the West African clade of the monkeypox virus. The outbreak was first reported in India on 14 July 2022 when Kerala's State Health Minister Veena George announced a suspected imported case which was confirmed hours later by the NIV. India was the tenth country to report a mpox case in Asia and the first in South Asia. Currently, India has reported 23 cases of mpox.

On 24 July, the first locally transmitted case was reported in Delhi. The individual, a middle-aged male who had no recent history of travelling abroad, was isolated in the Lok Nayak Hospital, New Delhi.

Background

Transmission 

A large portion of those infected were believed to have not recently traveled to areas of Africa where mpox is normally found, such as Nigeria, the Democratic Republic of the Congo as well as central and western Africa. It is believed to be transmitted by close contact with sick people, with extra caution for those individuals with lesions on their skin or genitals, along with their bedding and clothing. The CDC has also stated that individuals should avoid contact and consumption of dead animals such as rats, squirrels, monkeys and apes along with wild game or lotions derived from animals in Africa.

In addition to more common symptoms, such as fever, headache, swollen lymph nodes, and rashes or lesions, some patients have also experienced proctitis, an inflammation of the rectum lining. CDC has also warned clinicians to not rule out mpox in patients with sexually transmitted infections since there have been reports of co-infections with syphilis, gonorrhea, chlamydia, and herpes.

History

Arrival 
On 14 July, a suspected mpox case was reported in the South-Indian state of Kerala by the State health minister Veena George. The patient was reportedly in close contact with a person who tested positive for mpox abroad in the United Arab Emirates, and arrived in India from UAE four days prior to the announcement.

Hours later, minister Veena George announced that the patient was confirmed to be infected with the mpox disease by the NIV of Pune.

Spread 
No community transmission or locally transmitted cases were detected in India until on 24 July, Delhi reported their first case, and the patient had no history of travel from abroad. He recently attended a party in Himachal Pradesh. Although community transmission of the disease in India wasn’t confirmed by the government health officials.

Timeline

May 2022

June 2022

July 2022 
14 July: A suspected mpox case was reported in Kerala. State health minister Veena George said that the patient was in close contact with a person who tested positive for mpox. The patient arrived in India from the United Arab Emirates four days earlier, according to the health minister, and was admitted to a hospital in the state after the patient showed symptoms, and samples were sent to the National Institute of Virology (NIV). It was also reported that tests in local hospitals confirmed that the individual was affected with disease, but still samples were sent to the NIV for confirmation, as per the guideline given by the central government.

31 July: A 22-year-old man who had been in the United Arab Emirates came back to India. During his stay in the UAE, he had been in contact with another man who also tested positive for the virus. He then tested positive for mpox in the UAE but left the country following the test, he then arrived in his home-district in Thrissur, Kerala on 22 July. At first, he didn't have much symptoms with others in contact with him saying he was actively playing 'football' and other daily activities. On 26 July, he was admitted to a hospital with a fever and the authorities announced a suspected case. On 31 July, he died in the hospital of an unknown cause. It was then reported he died of mpox.

Responses

Central government 
After the outbreak was highlighted on mid-May, Union Health Minister Mansukh Mandaviya directed the National Centre for Disease Control (NCDC) and the Indian Council of Medical Research (ICMR) to keep a close watch and monitor the situation. The Union Health Ministry has also directed airport and other port health officers to be vigilant and have been instructed to isolate and send samples to the National Institute of Virology (NIV) in Pune of any sick passenger with a travel history to infected countries.

State and Union territory governments 
 Karnataka: Following the directions of the Union Health Ministry, Karnataka state government directed officials to set up mpox surveilience and set up a two-bed isolation ward in every district hospital to isolate suspected or confirmed cases.

 Madhya Pradesh: The state health department issued an advisory about pox-related diseases (especially Smallpox and Mpox) on early June. Health Commissioner-and-Secretary Sudam Khade directed all district Chief Medical and Health Officers (CMHOs) to take necessary steps as per the advisory when needed.

 West Bengal: The West Bengal state government issued an advisory on June. In the advisory, the State Health Department asked hospitals in the state to set up separate facilities to accommodate patients coming from abroad with symptoms and collect and sent samples of suspected patients to the NIV.

 Uttar Pradesh: On June, Uttar Pradesh Chief Medical Officer issued an advisory for and District Magistrates and other higher health officials of the state to remain alert. The advisory directed that information on patients with fever and rashes to be shared with the office of the CMO.

Others

Cases and Statistics

Total Cases Graph

See also
2022–2023 mpox outbreak
Timeline of the 2022–2023 mpox outbreak
2022–2023 mpox outbreak in Asia
 2022–2023 mpox outbreak in Israel
 2022–2023 mpox outbreak in Japan
2022–2023 mpox outbreak in Europe
 2022–2023 mpox outbreak in France
 2022–2023 mpox outbreak in Germany
 2022–2023 mpox outbreak in the Netherlands
 2022–2023 mpox outbreak in Portugal
 2022–2023 mpox outbreak in Spain
 2022–2023 mpox outbreak in the United Kingdom
2022–2023 mpox outbreak in Canada
2022–2023 mpox outbreak in Brazil
2022–2023 mpox outbreak in Peru
2022–2023 mpox outbreak in South Africa
2022–2023 mpox outbreak in the United States
 Mpox in Nigeria
 Mpox in the Democratic Republic of the Congo
COVID-19 pandemic in India

Notes

References 

India
Mpox
Mpox